Viktor Dorovskikh (born 19 October 1950) is a race walker who represented the Soviet Union.

International competitions

References

1950 births
Living people
Russian male racewalkers
Soviet male racewalkers
World Athletics Championships athletes for the Soviet Union
Friendship Games medalists in athletics